Ethmia palawana is a moth in the family Depressariidae. It was described by Schultze in 1925. It is found in the Philippines (Palawan).

References

Moths described in 1925
palawana
Insects of the Philippines
Fauna of Palawan